Aja Naomi King (born January 11, 1985) is an American actress. She played Michaela Pratt in How to Get Away with Murder. She began her career in guest-starring roles on television, and starred as Cassandra Kopelson in The CW medical comedy-drama Emily Owens, M.D.

In 2014, King began starring as Michaela Pratt in the ABC legal drama series How to Get Away with Murder, for which she received an NAACP Image Award for Outstanding Supporting Actress in a Drama Series nomination in 2015. She also has starred in the films Four (2012) and Reversion (2015). In 2016, she portrayed Cherry Turner in the historical film The Birth of a Nation (2016) and the following year appeared in the comedy-drama The Upside (2017).

Early life
King was born in Los Angeles and grew up in Walnut, California. She received a Bachelor of Fine Arts in Acting from the University of California, Santa Barbara, and a Master of Fine Arts from Yale University's School of Drama in 2010. At Yale University, King performed in a number of productions, including A Midsummer Night's Dream, Little Shop of Horrors, and Angels in America: A Gay Fantasia on National Themes.

Career

2010–2013
King appeared in several short films in the early period of her career. She made her television debut in 2010, as a guest star in the CBS police procedural Blue Bloods, and later appeared on Person of Interest, The Blacklist and Deadbeat. She made her feature film debut in the 2011 independent film Damsels in Distress, as a minor character. Her big break came in 2012, when she was cast as new surgical intern Cassandra Kopelson and the series' primary antagonist, on the CW medical comedy-drama series Emily Owens, M.D. The series was canceled after a single season in 2013.  She later starred in the Amazon Studios comedy pilot The Onion Presents: The News.

In 2013, King co-starred in two independent films. She played Abigayle, the daughter of Wendell Pierce's character, in the independent drama Four, released on September 13, 2013. Along with her castmates, she won a Los Angeles Film Festival Award for Best Performance by Cast for her role in this movie. She also appeared alongside Laverne Cox and Britne Oldford in the film 36 Saints. In 2014, she had supporting role in the romantic comedy The Rewrite, starring Hugh Grant and Marisa Tomei. The film was shot in 2013 but was released theatrically in the United States in 2015.

2014–present: Breakthrough

In early 2014, King had a recurring role as Ali Henslee in the ABC medical drama series Black Box, starring Kelly Reilly. The series was canceled after a single season. In February 2014, she was cast as one of the main characters in the ABC legal thriller How to Get Away with Murder, produced by Shonda Rhimes. The series stars Viola Davis as a law professor Annalise Keating. King plays the role of Michaela Pratt, one of the five lead students, alongside Alfred Enoch, Jack Falahee, Matt McGorry, and Karla Souza. The series premiered on September 25, 2014 with generally positive reviews from critics, and 14 million viewers. King received her first NAACP Image Award nomination for her performance in series.

In 2015, King had her first the leading role in the science-fiction thriller Reversion. The film had limited theatrical release on October 9, 2015. Also in 2015, she was cast as the female lead in the historical drama film The Birth of a Nation, based on the story of the 1831 slave rebellion led by Nat Turner. The film also stars Nate Parker, Aunjanue Ellis, Gabrielle Union, and Armie Hammer. She played Nat Turner's wife, Cherry. The film premiered in competition at the 2016 Sundance Film Festival on January 25, 2016, and received positive reviews from critics. King's performance was also well received. Variety placed her in their list of one of the "Biggest Breakthrough Performances" at Sundance, writing that "King transforms herself from contemporary glamour girl to 19th-century slave in Nate Parker's festival smash. A harrowing scene late in the film opposite Parker as Nat Turner reveals a depth and range King has never been asked to deliver in her small screen work, and a potential new star is born." King has also been shortlisted as a possible contender for the Academy Award for Best Supporting Actress but did not receive a nomination. She received a NAACP Image Award for Outstanding Supporting Actress in a Motion Picture nomination for her role. She received the "Rising Star Award" at the 10th annual Essence Black Women In Hollywood event in February 2017.

In 2017, King appeared opposite Kevin Hart, Bryan Cranston, and Nicole Kidman in The Upside, a remake of the 2011 French film The Intouchables. Later that year, she was cast in the leading role of Somali activist Ifrah Ahmed in the biopic A Girl from Mogadishu. In 2020, she appeared in the drama film Sylvie's Love, opposite Tessa Thompson and Nnamdi Asomugha. King later played a female leading role in the historical drama film The 24th about Houston riot of 1917 directed by Kevin Willmott. King will next star in Michael Maren A Little White Lie in 2023. She also starred opposite Nnamdi Asomugha in his feature directorial debut, The Knife.

Personal life
In March 2021, she announced that she was pregnant after previously experiencing two miscarriages. On June 6, 2021, she announced that she had given birth to a son, Kian, with husband Dan King.

Public image
King was the face of skincare line Olay's fall 2015 advertising campaign. She became a spokesperson for L'Oreal Paris in 2017. King has graced the covers of numerous magazines, including Vanity Fair, Elle, Marie Claire, Nylon, Glamour, Essence, Entertainment Weekly and Shape.

Filmography

Film

Television

Awards and nominations

References

External links
 
 

1985 births
21st-century American actresses
Actresses from Los Angeles
African-American actresses
American film actresses
American television actresses
Living people
People from Walnut, California
University of California, Santa Barbara alumni
Yale School of Drama alumni
21st-century African-American women
21st-century African-American people
20th-century African-American people
20th-century African-American women